Eleonoor ("Noor") Wendeline Holsboer (born July 12, 1967 in Enschede, Overijssel) is a former Dutch field hockey defender, who twice won a bronze Olympic medal with the Women's National Team: in 1988 and in 1996.

From 1987 to 1997 she played a total number of 139 international matches for the Netherlands.

External links
 
 Dutch Hockey Federation

1967 births
Living people
Dutch female field hockey players
Olympic field hockey players of the Netherlands
Field hockey players at the 1988 Summer Olympics
Field hockey players at the 1992 Summer Olympics
Field hockey players at the 1996 Summer Olympics
Sportspeople from Enschede
Olympic medalists in field hockey
Medalists at the 1988 Summer Olympics
Medalists at the 1996 Summer Olympics
Olympic bronze medalists for the Netherlands
20th-century Dutch women
21st-century Dutch women